Jacques Manuel (1897–1968) was a French costume designer and occasional film editor and director.

Selected filmography

Costume designer
 La Route impériale (1935)
 Woman of Malacca (1937)
 The Citadel of Silence (1937)
 Adrienne Lecouvreur (1938)
 Three Waltzes (1938)
 Vautrin the Thief (1943)
 The Captain (1946)

Editor
 The New Men (1936)
 The Woman Thief (1938)
 La Comédie du bonheur (1940)

Director
 Julie de Carneilhan (1950)

References

Bibliography 
 Goble, Alan. The Complete Index to Literary Sources in Film. Walter de Gruyter, 1999.

External links 
 

1897 births
1968 deaths
Film people from Paris
French film editors
French film directors
French costume designers

fr:Jacques Manuel